Nolic is a census-designated place (CDP) located on the Tohono O'odham Indian Reservation in Pima County, Arizona, United States. The population was 37 at the 2010 census.

Geography
Nolic is located at  (32.034183, −111.955021).

Demographics

As of the 2010 census, there were 37 people living in the CDP: 16 male and 21 female. 17 were 19 years old or younger, 6 were ages 20–34, 2 were between the ages of 35 and 49, 3 were between 50 and 64, and the remaining 9 were aged 65 and above. The median age was 25.5 years.

The racial makeup of the CDP was 95% American Indian, and 5% White. 8% of the population were Hispanic or Latino of any race.

There were 13 households in the CDP, nine family households (69%) and four non-family households (31%), with an average household size of 2.9. Of the family households, two were married couples living together, while there were one single father and six single mothers; the non-family households included four adults living alone: three male and one female.

The CDP contained 15 housing units, of which 13 were occupied and two were vacant.

References

Census-designated places in Pima County, Arizona